Lovely is an unincorporated community located in Martin County, Kentucky, United States.

History
A post office called Lovely has been in operation since 1931. Lovely was the name of the town's merchant, Samuel Dorsey Lovely. A folk etymology maintains the community was so named on account of the "lovely" scenery of the original town site.

Education
Lovely has a lending library, a branch of the Martin County Public Library.

References

Unincorporated communities in Martin County, Kentucky
Unincorporated communities in Kentucky